Yalquz Aghaj (also Romanized as Yālqūz Āghāj; also known as Bāltūz Āghāj, Lāl Kūzācāch, Lālqūzācāch, and Yālqūz Āqāj) is a village in Barvanan-e Gharbi Rural District, Torkamanchay District, Meyaneh County, East Azerbaijan Province, Iran. At the 2006 census, its population was 255, in 79 families.

References 

Populated places in Meyaneh County